The Fairmont State Fighting Falcons are the athletic teams that represent Fairmont State University, located in Fairmont, West Virginia, in NCAA Division II intercollegiate sports. The Falcons compete as members of the Mountain East Conference.

Varsity teams

List of teams

Men's sports
 Baseball
 Basketball
 Cross Country
 Football
 Golf
 Swimming
 Tennis
 Wrestling

Women's sports
 Acrobatics & Tumbling
 Basketball
 Cross Country
 Golf
 Lacrosse
 Soccer
 Softball
 Swimming
 Tennis

References

External links